The Museo Arqueológico Municipal de El Puerto de Santa María is a museum located in El Puerto de Santa María, in the  province of Cádiz, southern Spain. It was founded in 1980.

It contains paintings and sculptures of Francisco Lameyer, Eulogio Varela Sartorio, Enrique Ochoa, Fernando Jesús, Juan Lara, Manolo Prieto, and some works of Rafael Alberti.

Some pieces are exhibited in another building called Hospitalito.

See also 
 List of museums in Spain

External links 

 Website

Buildings and structures in El Puerto de Santa María
Arqueologico Municipal El Puerto De Santa Maria
Arqueologico Municipal El Puerto De Santa Maria
Archaeological museums in Spain
1980 establishments in Spain